Ignacio Herbert "Nacio Herb" Brown (February 22, 1896 – September 28, 1964) was an American writer of popular songs, movie scores and Broadway theatre music in the 1920s through the early 1950s. Amongst his most enduring work is the score for the 1952 musical film Singin' in the Rain.

Life and career
Ignacio Herbert Brown was born in Deming, New Mexico, United States, to Ignacio and Cora Brown. He had an older sister, Charlotte. In 1901, his family moved to Los Angeles, where he attended Manual Arts High School. His music education started with instruction from his mother, Cora Alice (Hopkins) Brown. Brown first operated a tailoring business (1916), and then became a financially successful realtor, but he always wrote and played music. After his first hit "Coral Sea" (1920) and a first big hit, "When Buddha Smiles" (1921), he eventually became a full-time composer. He joined The American Society of Composers, Authors and Publishers (ASCAP) in 1927.

In 1928, he was hired to work in Hollywood by MGM and write film scores for the new medium of sound film. For his film work, he often collaborated with lyricist Arthur Freed. Their music is collected for the most part in Singin' in the Rain. He appeared in the MGM variety film The Hollywood Revue of 1929. Brown also worked with Richard A. Whiting and Buddy De Sylva on Broadway Musicals such as Take a Chance.

Along with L. Wolfe Gilbert, Brown wrote the music for the children's television western, Hopalong Cassidy, which first aired in 1949.

After an 18-month illness and a brief hospitalization at UCSF Medical Center, Brown died of cancer on September 28, 1964, in San Francisco, California, at the home of his children, Nacio Jan Brown and Candace Nacio Brown.

Marriage
Brown was married at least five times.
 Ruby Porter, with whom he had one child, Nacio Herb Brown, Jr., who also became a composer. Brown and Porter divorced in 1931.
 In 1932 he married Jeanne Borlini Lockhart.
 In 1934 he married actress Anita Page. 
 Beffie Kellogg
 In 1942 he married Georgeann Morris. They divorced in 1952. The couple had two children, Nacio Jan Brown, b.1943, and Candace Brown, b. 1945.

Legacy
He was inducted into the Songwriters Hall of Fame in 1970, and into the New Mexico Entertainment Hall of Fame in 2012.

Published songs and music
"All I Do Is Dream of You"
"Alone"
"American Bolero"
"Avalon Town "
"Broadway Melody"
"Broadway Rhythm"
"Doll Dance"
"Eadie Was a Lady"
"Good Morning"
"I've Got a Feelin’ You're Foolin"'
"Love Is Where You Find It"
"Lucky Star"
"Make 'Em Laugh"
"The Moon Is Low" (with Arthur Freed)
"A New Moon Is Over My Shoulder"
"Our Big Love Scene"
"Pagan Love Song" (with Arthur Freed)
"Paradise" (1931)
"Should I"
"Singin' in the Rain"
"Sweetheart Darlin"'
"Temptation"
"Wedding of the Painted Doll"
"When Buddha Smiles" (1921)
"Would You"
"You Are My Lucky Star"
"You Stepped Out of a Dream"
"You Were Meant For Me"

References

External links

SHoF page on Nacio Herb Brown
More complete list of songs on ASCAP site
Hopalong Cassidy Music

Nacio Herb Brown recordings at the Discography of American Historical Recordings.

1896 births
1964 deaths
Songwriters from New Mexico
American musical theatre composers
Broadway composers and lyricists
Burials at Inglewood Park Cemetery
Writers from San Francisco
Vaudeville performers
People from Deming, New Mexico
20th-century American musicians